The Birmingham Railway and Electric Company was both a street car and electricity provider in Birmingham, Alabama, US.

Created in 1890 after the consolidation of several street railway operators, including the Birmingham Street Railway:

 Highland Avenue and Belt Railroad 1885-1890
 East Lake Land Company 1886-1890
 East Birmingham Land Company 1887-1890
 Bessemer and Birmingham Railroad 1887-1890
 Enselt Company 1887-1890

In 1940, BREC became Birmingham Electric Company. 

The company faced increased pressure from car after World War II and ridership declined. By the 1950s streetcar operations gave way to bus service in the city. Forty-seven streamlined PCC streetcars, which went into service in 1947, were sold to the Toronto Transit Commission in 1953.

BEC changed its name to Birmingham Transit Company in 1951. In 1972, the Birmingham-Jefferson County Transit Authority took over public transit operations.

Fleet

1950s

In addition to a variety of older cars kept in service, BEC ordered 47 PCC streetcars, at a cost of $25,000 each, from Pullman Standard in 1947. Birmingham's cars were the 17425 model and were manufactured at the Osgood Bradley plant in Worcester, Massachusetts. The interiors were three shades of green with coffee-colored leather upholstery, stainless steel seat backs and chrome trim. The cars entered service on August 31, 1947. The exterior color scheme was updated to navy blue skirts with cream above, separated by a scarlet stripe.

References
 Hudson, Alvin W. and Harold E. Cox (1976) Street Railways of Birmingham. Forty Fort, Pennsylvania: Harold E. Cox
 Clemons, Marvin and Lyle Key (2008) Birmingham Rails: The Last Golden Era from World War II to Amtrak. Birmingham: Red Mountain Press. 
 Birmingham - Jefferson County Transit Authority

Defunct Alabama railroads
Defunct public transport operators in the United States